There Goes the Neighborhood, released as Paydirt in most foreign countries, is a 1992 comedy film directed by Bill Phillips. The film tells a story of a dying prisoner who whispers the location of hidden loot to the facility's psychologist Willis Embry (Jeff Daniels), and, separately, three prison escapees, who all head to New Jersey to find it.

Synopsis

Prison psychologist Willis Embry reports for work at a New Jersey jail. His day has not gone well—his apartment has just been burgled and his girlfriend has dumped him, leaving just a message on his answering machine. His group therapy meeting with a bunch of inmates goes no better.

Cellmates Lyle and 'Handsome' Harry, are particularly recalcitrant. In a supposedly private meeting later with a cancer-stricken elderly convict, "Trick", who has only a few weeks to live, Embry is taken into his confidence about a job pulled many years earlier when he and some friends stole some $8.5 million of Mafia money, hidden in a casino skim bank. As a last request, he says that Embry can have half, and give the other half to a female friend named Louise. He tells Embry to go to Cherry Hill, New Jersey and dig down seven feet in the basement of a house on Pleasant Street, number 7322.

Unknown to them, however, Lyle is listening in the cell next-door, though he fails to hear the house number correctly, putting down 7324 instead and then changing it to 7320.

Meanwhile, over at number 7322, things are not going well. Jessie Lodge and her temperamental husband, Albert, are in the middle of a rather messy divorce, and Albert's way of dividing things in half involves taking a chainsaw to a piano. Across the road, their neighbours, writers Jeffrey Babbit and Lydia Nunn, are supposed to be writing their latest best-selling book, but spend most of their time spying on their neighbours with binoculars from their front window. They are also spying on Norman and Peedi Rutledge, who live at number 7320.

Later, a jailbreak is being made from prison, with former armed robber Marvin helping Lyle and Harry escape from the joint. They disguise themselves as landscape gardeners. Told by Lyle to "take care of" Willis, the sociopathic Marvin has left behind a surprise in Willis's apartment, a tripwire attached to a bomb.

Laden with heavy groceries, Willis drops them on the floor and notices a can rolling across the floor to the wire. He manages to jump clear from the building before it is engulfed by a huge explosion. Somehow, there are apparently no other casualties. The neighbors and police think Willis is dead although there being no sign of a body.

The following morning, seemingly respectable Norman Rutledge is about to leave for work in his car when a landscape gardeners van blocks his exit, and Lyle, Harry and Marvin emerge to take him back inside, where Norman's wife Peedi is also taken hostage.  The couple are questioned about the floor in their basement and the three circles and a triangle that should mark the spot of the treasure.  Circles or no circles, the crooks decide to dig in the basement anyway. Meanwhile, Willis arrives next door at number 7322 and poses as a furnace engineer to get inside Jessie Lodge's house and scout the basement for the digging spot. When she realises he isn't an engineer however, she throws him out.

Marvin meanwhile is out of pills. Without them he is even more psychotic than usual. Norman points out that Jeffrey and Lydia are probably the nosiest neighbours in the world, and using a pneumatic drill makes a terrible racket. He suggests using a lawnmower to mask the noise. Marvin eventually agrees, and tells Lyle to get outside and mow.

Jeffrey and Lydia have already noticed the van, and are wondering how the Rutledges can afford a gardener. Jeffrey is also wondering how Lydia managed to phone Marty Rollins, a sleazy local real estate agent and "sex fiend", without looking his phone number up. Lydia denies this but Jeffrey does not believe her.

Over at the Rutledge's house, Harry and Peedi are starting to get on quite well and the former is very much in love with her. Peedi for her part is suitably charmed by the attention. Her marriage to Norman has been a sham for some time, and they haven't shared a bed together for many years. Norman, meanwhile, is offering more unsolicited advice to the prison escapees 
about moving their van, suggesting the neighbours need to see that it is "business as usual". Willis, meanwhile, is still trying to get into Jessie's house and breaks into the basement.

Just as she is about to call the police, Willis reveals the story about the $8.5 million, and says that he'll share his half with her 50/50. She agrees, they find the spot and start to dig. Night falls, and Peedi and Norman spend the night handcuffed together. She later admits to Harry that she has never spent the night tied up before. They are both becoming attracted to each other, as are Willis and Jessie. Harry asks what "Peedi" is short for, and she reveals it stands for Penelope Diane.

A suspicious Jeffrey meanwhile phones up Marty Rollins and accuses him of having an affair with his wife. Marty, who is at that moment in bed with another client's wife (Robin Duke), mistakes the voice and tells the woman her husband knows about them, causing her to cry hysterically.

Next morning, Lydia's daughter Swan is out collecting her paperboy money. She is suspicious not only of Lyle, still doing the gardening at number 7320, but also of Jessie and Willis at number 7322 as she looks into the window in the basement and sees them digging a mysterious hole. Jessie is having problems keeping the perpetually horny Marty at bay, as he continues to try and bring possible buyers to the house, while her estranged husband Albert also shows up again, although the taller and stronger Willis pretends to be her lover and sends him packing. Later that evening, Marvin hears a noise from next door and sends Lyle to investigate. He notices Willis next door, and the trio of criminals soon realise that they are at the wrong house.

Norman shows a radically new side of his personality and uses this event to his advantage, offering his help.  He moves a jukebox from the wall and opens a door into a secret room full of contraband and weapons. He proposes a deal - they join forces and launch an assault next door to take the money by force. Lyle is not happy, but Marvin agrees, and Norman takes charge.

After a failed attempt at taking the house by force when they are repelled by a crossbow, Norman orders that their existing hole be turned into a tunnel and be extended next door.  After buying some more time, Jessie and Willis meanwhile, continue digging. Not long after, Lyle and Harry break through in their tunnel but come up instead in Jessie's swimming pool, with the water coming back through into the basement. Peedi, still handcuffed to a chair, is released by Harry with a hacksaw before the room becomes completely flooded.  Norman is nowhere to be seen.  A suspicious Albert has already called in the police, and Marvin and Lyle attempt to escape via the front door with Lyle disguised as a woman.

After initially coming out of their front door with their hands up, Willis and Jessie realise that the police are only interested in events next door, but Marty has already noticed their suspicious behavior. Norman, meanwhile, emerges from Jessie's empty swimming pool in full scuba gear. As events move towards their climax, Harry gives himself up to the police, while Lyle and Marvin's disguise is blown and they are arrested. Willis and Jessie find the money, but first Norman and then Marty try to steal it from them. In the end it is young Swan who knocks Marty out and the trio escape out the front door.  The money is found to be wet, gone to mush and therefore completely useless. Jessie and Willis have not broken any laws and are free to go. Just as Marty is dragged away, Jeffrey pulls a gun of his own, and accuses him of sleeping with Lydia. She says that she knew his phone number because it was on the 'for sale' board, so Jeffrey too joins the ranks of the arrested, although Marty and Lydia exchange a sly nod and a wink as he is led into the paddy wagon. Norman is caught as he ludicrously attempts to escape on Swan's bicycle. Peedi calls him the biggest crook of all, and instead gives 'Handsome' Harry a kiss as he is led away and promises to write to him.

Later, as they sit together in the hole in their basement and realize their true love for each other, Willis and Jessie notice a large bag of hidden gold coins. The film ends as Jessie and Willis drive off into the sun together to fulfil his bargain to 'Trick' and give half of the money to the mysterious Louise.

Main cast
 Jeff Daniels as Willis Embry: Willis Embry is a none-too successful psychologist who works in a New Jersey prison. His girlfriend has just left him, but his life takes a turn for the better when an elderly dying prisoner named "Trick" reveals to Embry the secret location of $8.5 million, money stolen from a Mafia skim bank, buried under the basement of a house at 7322 Pleasant Street, Cherry Hill.
 Catherine O'Hara as Jessica "Jessie" Lodge: Jessie Lodge is going through a very messy divorce with her estranged husband Albert. She lives at 7322 Pleasant Street, Cherry Hill and strikes an agreement with Willis Embry to find the money hidden under her basement.
 Hector Elizondo as Norman "Norm" Rutledge: Norm Rutledge and his wife Peedi live at number 7320 Pleasant Street, Cherry Hill. Norman leads a boring life with an unspecified 7-to-7 job in the city, but also keeps a secret stash of weapons and contraband in a hidden secret room in his basement and is probably the biggest crook of them all. A hostage at first, along with his wife Peedi, he later takes over as leader from Marvin and concocts his own plan to recover the money from next-doors basement.
 Rhea Perlman as Lydia Nunn: Lydia Nunn and husband Jeffrey Babitt are successful authors, who when they are not trying to write their next book are the nosiest neighbours in the world and are never without a pair of binoculars, looking out their window at the comings and goings in the neighborhood.
 Judith Ivey as Peedi Rutledge: Peedi (or Penelope Diane) is the long-suffering wife of Norm Rutledge. Whatever love or magic there had been in their marriage many years ago has long since gone. She strikes up a friendship with Handsome Harry.
 Harris Yulin as Marvin Boyd: Marvin Boyd has served time in prison for armed robbery. A psychotic who takes psychotropic medications, he uses his skills in enabling the prison break and gives the orders until Norman takes control. He runs out of his medication shortly after the escape.
 Jonathan Banks as Handsome Harry: Harry shares a cell with Lyle in prison. He is the most sympathetic criminal character and falls in love with Peedi Rutledge when they hold her and Norman hostage as they attempt to dig for the money.
 Dabney Coleman as Jeffrey Babitt: Jeffrey and his wife Lydia are authors. Lydia has a daughter Swan from a previous marriage. Swan and Jeffrey despise each other, although Lydia makes them pretend to kiss every morning.  
 Chazz Palminteri as Lyle Corrente: Lyle shares a cell with Harry in prison. He also has anger management issues, but is nowhere near as psychotic as Marvin. Willis blames his problems on trying to prove that he is harder than his brother. It is Lyle who overhears the conversation between Willis and Trick about the $8.5 million, although he mishears the address and fatefully takes his fellow convicts to 7320 Pleasant Street (the home of the Rutledges), not 7322.
 Richard Portnow as Marty Rollins: Marty Rollins is a real estate agent who is trying to sell Jessie's house. He hasn't sold a house in three years, and is receiving help as a sexaholic.
 Jeremy Piven as Albert Lodge: Albert Lodge is the estranged husband of Jessie Lodge. We first see him wielding a chainsaw at a piano and dividing it equally in two. The divorce is not going well.
 Heidi Zeigler as Swan Babitt: Swan is the daughter of Lydia Nunn. She has a job as a paperboy. She and her stepfather mutually despise each other.
 William Morgan Sheppard as Trick Bissell

Critical and commercial performance
There Goes the Neighborhood was not a commercial success.  According to movie stats website www.the-numbers.com, the total US box office gross was a mere $11,000.

It was competing with a number of other high-profile films at the same time - Quentin Tarantino's "Reservoir Dogs" had been released only a week earlier on 23 October 1992, Steven Seagal action flick "Under Siege", had been released on 9 October, with Disney family film "The Mighty Ducks" having been released on 2 November 1992 would be no less busy film-wise, with "Passenger 57", "Aladdin", "Malcolm X", "The Bodyguard" and "Home Alone 2: Lost in New York" all going on general release during the month. It is perhaps not surprising therefore that "There Goes the Neighborhood" came and went from US cinemas quite quickly.

As of 16 May 2022, some 1,200 individual users of the IMDb website had given this film a weighted average vote of 5.7.

Availability

Previously available on VHS in most territories including the United States and United Kingdom where it was given a BBFC rating of "15".  In the United States it is rated as PG-13, though it has long since been deleted in both countries and is currently only available second-hand from specialist retailers or from eBay.  Although it is available on eBay in several DVD forms (all region 0), including an apparently official Polish edition (marketed as "Brudne Pieniądze" on the Carlton label) and a Dutch version titled as "The Hidden Fortune"
, it has not yet been made officially available on this format in the USA (region 1) or the UK (region 2) under any of its two main English-language titles.  The region 0 discs that are available are 4:3 full-frame only, not widescreen.

Soundtrack Listing

 It's Only Natural, written by Neil Finn and Tim Finn, performed by Crowded House
 Life Is a Highway, written and performed by Tom Cochrane

References

External links 

 
 
 

1992 films
1990s crime comedy films
American crime comedy films
Paramount Pictures films
1992 comedy films
1990s English-language films
1990s American films
Treasure hunt films